Telia Company AB is a Swedish multinational telecommunications company and mobile network operator present in Sweden, Finland, Norway, Denmark, Estonia, Latvia and Lithuania.

Telia also owns TV4 Media which includes TV4 in Sweden, MTV Oy in Finland, and C More Entertainment after acquiring them in 2019.

The company is headquartered in Solna and its stock is traded on the Stockholm Stock Exchange and on the Helsinki Stock Exchange.

History
Telia Company in its current form was first established as TeliaSonera, as the result of a 2002 merger between the Swedish and Finnish telecommunications companies, Telia and Sonera. This merger followed three years after Telia's failed merger attempt with Norwegian telecommunications company Telenor, now its chief competitor in the Nordic countries.

Before privatisation, Telia was a state telephone monopoly. Sonera, on the other hand, had a monopoly only on trunk network calls, while most (c. 75%) of local telecommunication was provided by telephone cooperatives. The separate brands Telia and Sonera continued to be used in the Swedish and Finnish markets respectively until March 2017, when Sonera was rebranded to Telia. Of the stock, 39.5% (31 March 2020) is owned by the Swedish government, and the rest by institutions, companies, and private investors worldwide. The Finnish government (through Solidium) divested from Telia Company in February 2018, when it sold its remaining 3.2% stake.

Telia

The Swedish Kungl. Telegrafverket (literally: Royal Telegraph Agency) was founded in 1853, when the first electric telegraph line was established between Stockholm and Uppsala. Allmänna Telefon found an equipment supplier in Lars Magnus Ericsson. In this early competition, Telegrafverket with its brand Rikstelefon was a latecomer. However, by securing a national monopoly on long-distance telephone lines, it was able with time to control and take over the local networks of quickly growing private telephone companies.

A de facto telephone monopoly position was reached around 1920, and never needed legal sanction. In 1953 the name was modernised to Televerket. On 1 July 1992, this huge government agency's regulating functions was split off into the Swedish Post and Telecom Authority (PTS), with similar functions as the Federal Communications Commission of the United States. The operation of the state radio and TV broadcast network was spun off into a company named Teracom. On 1 July 1993, the remaining telephone and mobile network operator was transformed into a government-owned shareholding company, named Telia AB. At the height of the dot-com bubble, on 13 June 2000, close to one-third of Telia's shares were introduced on the Stockholm Stock Exchange.

In the 1980s, Televerket was a pioneering mobile network operator with the NMT system, followed in the 1990s by GSM. Private competition in analogue mobile phone systems had already broken the telephone monopoly, and the growing internet allowed more opportunities for competitors. The most important of Telia's Swedish competitors in these areas has been Tele2. When PTS awarded four licenses for the 3rd generation mobile networks in December 2000, Telia was not among the winners, but later established an agreement to build a 3G network jointly with Tele2 using Tele2's licence. SUNAB was founded as the jointly owned company that would in turn build, own and operate the joint 3G network. In December 2018, Telia in cooperation with Ericsson launched Sweden's first 5G network at KTH Royal Institute of Technology in Stockholm.

Sonera
The history of Sonera dates back to 1917, when Suomen Lennätinlaitos (Finnish Telegraph Agency) was founded. In 1927, the telegraph agency was merged with the Finnish Post to form a new agency, Post and Telegraph Agency. This agency governed all long distance and international calls until 1994, when competitors were allowed to enter the Finnish market. In the same year, the Post and Telegraph Agency was divided to form two companies, Suomen Posti Oy (Finnish Post), and Telecom Finland Oy. Telecom Finland then changed its name to Sonera in 1998.

After the merger of Telia and Sonera
During the run-up to the 2006 general election the Swedish liberal-conservative Alliance stated as one of its policy aims to reduce government ownership in commercial entities, and specifically to sell its stake in TeliaSonera. The Alliance went on to win the election and formed a coalition government. After the merger with Sonera, the Swedish State held 46% of the shares and with parliamentary approval the government sold down to 37.3%. Further divestment of TeliaSonera was however presented to the parliament only after the next election in 2010, when the Alliance lost its majority but stayed on as a minority administration.

On 16 March 2011, the Alliance administration lost a parliamentary vote on sale of publicly owned commercial entities, including TeliaSonera, when a coalition of all opposition parties — the Left Party, Social Democratic Party, Green Party and Sweden Democrats — united against the Alliance.

In the beginning of 2008, TeliaSonera announced measures to save nearly 500 million Euros which would include 2900 redundancies: 2000 from Sweden and 900 from Finland. France Télécom (now Orange S.A.) proposed a 33 billion Euro acquisition offer for TeliaSonera on 5 June 2008, which was promptly rejected by the company's board.

On 12 April 2016, the company was renamed to Telia Company, dropping the Sonera part, rebranding the company to aid recover after bribery and money laundering allegations.

On 20 July 2018, Telia Company announced the acquisition proposal of Bonnier Broadcasting Group from Bonnier Group for 9.2 billion SEK (roughly $1 billion), thus owning TV4 AB (commercial television broadcaster in Sweden), MTV Oy (commercial television broadcaster in Finland) and C More Entertainment (pan-Nordic operator of premium television channels). The European Commission approved the deal on 12 November 2019 with certain conditions, and the acquisition was completed on 2 December that year.

Ahead of the completion of Bonnier Broadcasting deal, the Telia Company nomination committee proposed on 20 October 2019, that Marie Ehrling be succeeded by Lars-Johan Jarnheimer, the former CEO of Tele2 until 2008, and then-chair of Egmont Media, as the company's board chair. The proposal was approved on 26 November that year, following the extraordinary general meeting. Meanwhile, on 24 October, Telia Company appointed Allison Kirkby, the former CEO of Tele2 from 2015 until 2018 and then went on to become the president and CEO of TDC, as the company's new president and CEO. Kirkby assumed office on 4 May 2020.

On 6 October 2020, Telia Company agreed to sell its Internet backbone unit Telia Carrier to Polhem Infra for roughly US$1 billion. The sale was completed on 1 June 2021.

Operations
Telia Company is the largest Nordic and Baltic fixed-voice, broadband, and mobile operator by revenue and customer base. It also owns a TV-media operation which includes TV4 in Sweden and MTV in Finland as well as C More.
Telia mobile telephone business in Europe:(Estonia, Latvia, Lithuania and Sweden) Leader company. (Finland, Norway) second company. (Denmark) third company.

Denmark
In Denmark, Telia Company operates a mobile operator (Telia), a mobile virtual network operator (Call Me), and a broadband supplier (Telia). The company started in 1995, the result of a merger between Telia Stofa and TeliaSonera. Telia Mobile is the third-largest operator and is in fierce competition with Telenor, which is number two in the market. Telia was the fourth operator to launch 3G services and is the only operator to have a nationwide EDGE network.

Telia Broadband was relaunched in 2008 because of the need for TeliaSonera to offer both mobile and broadband in all of their home markets (Sweden, Norway, Denmark and Finland). Telia Broadband was the first operator to launch digital TV with their broadband at no extra cost. Stofa is mainly a cable TV operator, but also supplies broadband via the cable TV network.

Estonia
Telia Company owns 100% of Eesti Telekom. Eesti Telekom is one of the largest telecommunication companies in the Baltic countries and the largest telecommunications company in Estonia. TeliaSonera and the Estonian government reached a deal over the sale of Eesti Telekom in September 2009. On 20 January 2016, Eesti Telekom switched its name to Telia Eesti.

Finland

Telia Finland is the second largest mobile operator in Finland and also one of the biggest providers of landline telephone and internet services. 
Before the rebranding on 23 March 2017, Telia was known in Finland under the brands of Sonera and Tele Finland. In September 1999, Sonera became the world's first mobile operator to launch mobile Internet services via Wireless Application Protocol (WAP).

Since 2014, Telia Finland and DNA Oyj have jointly deployed a shared 4G LTE network using the 800 MHz (LTE Band 20) "digital dividend" band in remote Northern and Eastern Finland under the Suomen Yhteisverkko Oy joint venture. Telia Finland owns 51% of Suomen Yhteisverkko Oy.

Latvia
TeliaSonera owns 49% of LMT (24.5% as Telia Company AB and 24.5% as Sonera Holding B.V.). TeliaSonera also owns 49% of Lattelecom, which owns 23% of LMT, which owns Okarte, Amigo. It also owns 100% of Telia Latvija, a business cable operator and data centre operator.

Lithuania
TeliaSonera owns 88.15% of Telia Lietuva (Teo LT until 2017), the largest landline phone operator in Lithuania, which recently purchased Omnitel, one of largest mobile network operators there. It was previously owned by TeliaSonera group.

In October 2015, TeliaSonera announced the merger of Teo and Omnitel, through the acquisition of Omnitel by Teo.

On 1 February 2017, Omnitel and Teo merged under the name of "Telia Lietuva".

Norway
In Norway, Telia first entered after the de-regulation in 1998 as a virtual supplier of fixed telephone and Internet services. This was sold to Enitel during the merger attempt with Telenor, but Telia re-entered in 2000 with the purchase of one of the two mobile network operators, NetCom. In 2006 it also bought the virtual mobile provider Chess Communication.

1 March 2016, NetCom was rebranded as Telia Norge.

In July 2018, Telia acquired Get AS and TDC Norway for $2.6 billion.

Sweden
In Sweden, Telia Company operates under the consumer brands Telia and its lower-cost flanker brands Halebop and Fello. On the business side, Skanova Access and Cygate are also used. Telia Sverige is currently the largest mobile phone operator in Sweden, both in terms of revenue and customer base. Main competitors include Tele2, Telenor, 3, Allente and Boxer.

Former operations
Telia has been selling off its shares in companies outside of its main region of business.

Afghanistan
In July 2020, Telia Company announced it has divested its 12.25% share in the Afghan Roshan (telco) cellphone network.

Azerbaijan
On 15 May 2010, after Azercell went through rebranding, it joined the network of TeliaSonera. On 5 March 2018, Telia confirmed they have sold their stake in Azercell.

Cambodia
TeliaSonera purchased a majority stake in Star-Cell in 2008 which was the number four player in the market at that time. By 2010 it exited Cambodia after a $100 million write down and collapse in subscriber numbers. It was subsequently taken over by a more dominant competitor Smart Mobile.

Georgia
From 2007 to 2018, Telia Company has owned 58.55% of the Geocell company, while Turkcell owns the remaining 41.45%. Since 2018 Silknet bought full part of Geocell.

Kazakhstan 
Telia Company operated in Kazakhstan under the brand Kcell. From 21 December 2018, Kcell sold to Kazakhtelecom.

Moldova 
In February 2020, Telia Company agreed to sell its 100% holding in Moldcell to CG Cell Technologies DAC, for a transaction price of US$31.5 million.

Nepal
TeliaSonera owned a majority stake in Ncell, the largest mobile operator in Nepal with US$16.2 billion operating income. On 21 December 2015, TeliaSonera announced its exit from Ncell, selling its 60.4 percent of the shares to Malaysian telecommunications group Axiata. TeliaSonera exited Nepal without settling billions of Capital Gains Tax owed to Nepalese government.

Russia 
Telia Company owned 25.2% of MegaFon, the second largest mobile phone operator in Russia. In October 2017, Telia Company agreed to sell their entire MegaFon stake for US$1 billion.

Spain 
Telia Company owned a 76.6% holding in the Spanish operator Yoigo until 21 June 2016 when it was sold to Masmovil.

Tajikistan
Telia Company owned 60% of mobile phone operator Tcell. Tcell is a merger of Somoncom and Indigo Tajikistan; the merger was completed in July 2012. On 27 April 2017, it was confirmed that Tcell has been sold.

Turkey
In October 2020, Telia Company's divestment of its 47.1 percent stake in Turkcell Holding (which holds 51% in the listed leading mobile operator in Turkey) to the state owned Turkey Wealth Fund for US$530 million, was completed.

Uzbekistan
In five years, Ucell, the Uzbek subsidiary, increased the number of its subscribers from 400,000 to 9 million (2012). Some former TeliaSonera executives were under preliminary investigation by Swedish prosecutors for allegations of bribery and money laundering associated with the acquisition of their 3G license in Uzbekistan from Takilant Limited, registered in Gibraltar. Under these investigations involving four Uzbek nationals, hundreds of millions of francs were frozen in Swiss banks. The former executives were acquitted in the first instance in the Swedish legal proceedings in February 2019, the verdict has been appealed. In September 2017 Telia Company announced that a global settlement had been reached with the U.S. Department of Justice (DOJ), Securities and Exchange Commission (SEC) and the Dutch Public Prosecution Service (Openbaar Ministerie, OM) relating to previously disclosed investigations regarding historical transactions in Uzbekistan. The global resolution ended all known corruption related investigations or inquiries into Telia Company.

Evolution of the Telia brand 

When Telia and Sonera merged in 2002, TeliaSonera used a simple wordmark as the logo. In 2011, TeliaSonera released its new purple pebble logo to the corporation and its affiliate brands. The pebble was designed by Landor Associates.

In 2016, TeliaSonera changed name to Telia Company and presented an updated pebble brand profile, designed by Wolff Olins, to be used by all Telia brand companies.

Controversies 
TeliaSonera has been accused of indirectly supporting dictatorships, allowing them to do man-in-the-middle attacks on their citizens. This was disclosed in the Swedish TV show Uppdrag Granskning in 2012. TeliaSonera responded to these allegations with: "This is happening every day in all countries and applies to all operators. We are obliged to comply with the legislation of each country."

Further allegations have been presented in Swedish media and elsewhere that TeliaSonera may have illegally, through bribery, acquired licenses in Uzbekistan and Azerbaijan. As a result of internal investigations on these and other potential violations to the company's policies, several senior managers were dismissed from the company.

When TeliaSonera exited Nepal there were voices raised in the public debate in Nepal that it had evaded approximately 36 billions of Nepalese Rupees Capital Gains Tax owed to Nepalese government, when it sold its stake to Axiata, a Malaysian Telecom Group, a claim which has been refuted by Telia Company on several occasions. In that context, Telia was criticized by media (TV) even in Sweden where its headquarters is located. Also, a group of Nepalese people started a movement 'No Tax.. No Ncell' to boycott the services of Ncell in Nepal.

See also

 List of Finnish companies
 List of Swedish companies
 Telia Carrier

References

External links

 
 Yahoo! - TeliaSonera AB Company Profile
 TeliaSonera CDN 

Mobile phone companies of Sweden
Internet service providers of Sweden
Telecommunications companies established in 2003
2003 establishments in Sweden
Telecommunications monopolies
Companies listed on Nasdaq Helsinki
Partly privatized companies of Finland
Partly privatized companies of Sweden
Companies based in Solna Municipality
Companies listed on Nasdaq Stockholm
Multinational companies headquartered in Sweden